Keith John Fielding (born 8 July 1949) is an English dual-code international rugby union, and professional rugby league footballer who played in the 1960s, 1970s and 1980s as a winger. He played representative level rugby union for England, and at club level for Moseley Rugby Football Club before switching to rugby league in 1973, and went on to play representative level rugby league for Great Britain and England, and at club level for Salford.

Rugby union career
Born in Birmingham, Fielding attended King Edward VI Five Ways school, where he began playing rugby union. In 1967, Fielding represented England Schools 19 Group.

After leaving school, Fielding went on to play for Loughborough Colleges and Moseley. Fielding won his first cap for England on 8 February 1969, playing against Ireland. Later that month, he scored a try in his second appearance for England in a match against France. In December 1969, he played in England's 11–8 win against South Africa, which was the team's first ever victory against the Springboks.

In 1970, Fielding played a key role in Loughborough College's Middlesex Sevens victory, scoring 11 tries during the tournament, including four in the final against Edinburgh Wanderers.

In 1971, Fielding was signed by Leicester Tigers, but returned to Moseley after playing only one first team game for the club.

Fielding returned to the England squad in 1972, playing in all four matches of the 1972 Five Nations. He made the last of his 10 appearances for England in March 1972 against Scotland.

Fielding scored 39 tries for Moseley in his final season at the club, the second highest total in Britain that year. In April 1973, Fielding represented England in the first ever international rugby sevens tournament.

Rugby league career

Salford
In May 1973, Fielding was signed by rugby league club Salford for a fee of £8,500.

Fielding played  in Salford's 9–19 defeat by Wigan in the 1973 Lancashire Cup Final during the 1973–74 season at Wilderspool Stadium, Warrington on Saturday 13 October 1973, played , and scored a goal in the 2–6 defeat by Widnes in the 1974 Lancashire Cup Final during the 1974–75 season at Central Park, Wigan on Saturday 2 November 1974, and played  in the 7–16 defeat by Widnes in the 1975 Lancashire Cup Final during the 1975–76 season at Central Park, Wigan on Saturday 4 October 1975.

Fielding played  in Salford's 0–0 draw with Warrington in the 1974 BBC2 Floodlit Trophy Final during the 1974–75 season at The Willows, Salford on Tuesday 17 December 1974, and played , and scored a try in the 10–5 victory over Warrington in the 1974 BBC2 Floodlit Trophy Final replay during the 1974–75 season at Wilderspool Stadium, Warrington on Tuesday 28 January 1975.

International honours
Fielding won caps for England while at Salford in 1975 against France, in the 1975 Rugby League World Cup against France, Wales, New Zealand, Australia, Wales and France, in 1975 against Papua New Guinea (non-Test).

He equalled the England national team's record for most tries by an individual in a match when he scored four against France at Parc Lescure, Bordeaux on Saturday 11 October 1975.

Fielding also won caps for Great Britain (RL) while at Salford in 1974 against France (2 matches), and in the 1977 Rugby League World Cup against France, and Australia.

Superstars
Keith Fielding achieved fame by participating in the televised all-around sports competition Superstars, winning the 1977 French European Superstars Heat, the 1981 British Final and the 1981 Challenge of Champions. He also finished second in the 1977 European Final, fifth in the 1978 World Final, third in the 1981 International Final, fifth in the 1981 World Final and third in the 1982 British Final.

Superstars record

Outside of rugby
Fielding was a teacher at Marple Hall School and Bramhall High School in Stockport. Fielding quit his role at the latter school in 2008 after declaring the job was too stressful. Keith Fielding also taught at Alderman Newton's Grammar school in Leicester in the early 1970s before turning professional. He also taught at Shenley Court Comprehensive in the 1970s.

References

External links
Statistics at scrum.com
Superstars roll of honour
Ex-rugby star's teaching hell
Field of memories
Keith Fielding – England Rugby Player – Rugby-Heroes.net

1949 births
Living people
Dual-code rugby internationals
England international rugby sevens players
England international rugby union players
England national rugby league team players
English rugby league players
English rugby union players
Great Britain national rugby league team players
Lancashire rugby league team players
Loughborough Students RUFC players
Moseley Rugby Football Club players
Other Nationalities rugby league team players
People educated at Bramhall High School
People educated at King Edward VI Five Ways
Rugby league players from Birmingham, West Midlands
Rugby league wingers
Rugby union players from Birmingham, West Midlands
Rugby union wings
Salford Red Devils players